Strategic voting, also called tactical voting, sophisticated voting or insincere voting, occurs in voting systems when a voter votes for another candidate or party than their sincere preference to prevent an undesirable outcome. For example, in a simple plurality election, a voter might gain a better outcome by voting for a less preferred but more generally popular candidate.

Gibbard's theorem shows that all single-winner voting methods encourage strategic voting, unless there are only two options or dictatorial (i.e., a distinguished agent exists who can impose the outcome).

For multi-winner elections no general theorem for strategic voting exists. Strategic voting, even under proportional representation systems, is observed due to non-proportionality, electoral thresholds and quotas. But in systems that use ranked voting, there is no need for strategic voting, and under STV it is impractical to engage in strategic voting.

Types of strategic voting 

 (sometimes "useful vote") A voter insincerely ranks an alternative higher in the hope of getting that candidate elected. For example, in the first-past-the-post election, voters may vote for an option they perceive as having a greater chance of winning vs. an option they prefer (e.g., voting for an uncontroversial moderate candidate over a controversial extremist candidate to help defeat a popular candidate of an opposing party). Duverger's law argues that, for this reason, first-past-the-post election methods lead to two-party systems in most cases. In those proportional representation methods that include a minimum percentage of votes that a party must achieve to receive any seats, people might vote tactically for a minor party to prevent it from dropping below that percentage (which would make the votes that candidate does receive useless for the larger political camp that party belongs to), or alternatively, those who support the viewpoints of a minor party may vote for the larger party whose views are closest to those of the minor party.
 A voter insincerely ranks an alternative lower in the hopes of defeating it. For example, in the Borda count or in a Condorcet method, a voter may insincerely rank a perceived strong alternative last in order to help their preferred alternative win.
 A voter ranks a perceived weak alternative above their preferred candidate, in order to actually elect the preferred candidate and not the weak candidate. For some electoral systems, a voter may actually elect their preferred candidate by voting for the weak candidate instead. This primarily occurs in runoff voting, when a voter already believes that their favored candidate will make it to the next round. The voter then ranks an undesirable, but easily beatable candidate higher so that their preferred candidate can win later. In the United States, for instance, voters of one party sometimes vote in the other party's primary to nominate a candidate who will be easy for their favorite to beat, especially after that favorite has secured their party's own nomination.
 A voter selects just one candidate, despite having the option to vote for more than one due to a voting method such as approval voting, plurality-at-large voting, and Condorcet methods. A voter helps their preferred candidate by not supplying votes to potential rivals. Bullet voting is a type of sincere voting. This strategy is encouraged and seen as beneficial in the methods of limited voting and cumulative voting. Election methods with no tactical advantage to bullet voting satisfy the later-no-harm criterion, including instant-runoff voting and single transferable vote.

Coordination
While people often vote tactically according to their own strategy, there are Web sites intended to assist in voting tactically in specific elections; the strategies of course vary according to the electoral system. Some sites are politically neutral, asking what outcome a user prefers and recommending the vote most likely to achieve it; others are partisan, aiming to elect—or to keep out—a particular party.

Examples in real elections

Canada 
The observed effect of Duverger's law in Canada is weaker than in other countries.
In the 1999 Ontario provincial election, strategic voting was encouraged by opponents of the Progressive Conservative government of Mike Harris. This failed to unseat Harris but succeeded in suppressing the Ontario New Democratic Party vote to a historic low.

In the 2004 federal election, and to a lesser extent in the 2006 election, strategic voting was a concern for the federal New Democratic Party (NDP). In the 2004 election, the governing Liberal Party was able to convince many New Democratic voters to vote Liberal to avoid a Conservative government. In the 2006 elections, the Liberal Party attempted the same strategy, with Prime Minister Paul Martin asking New Democrats and Greens to vote for the Liberal Party to prevent a Conservative win. The New Democratic Party leader Jack Layton responded by asking voters to "lend" their votes to his party, suggesting that the Liberal Party was bound to lose the election regardless of strategic voting.

During the 2015 federal election, strategic voting was primarily against the Conservative government of Stephen Harper, which had benefited from vote splitting among centrist and left-leaning parties in the 2011 election. Following the landslide victory of the Liberals led by Justin Trudeau over Harper's Conservatives, observers noted that the increase in support for the Liberals at the expense of the NDP and Green Party was partially due to strategic voting for Liberal candidates.

France 
The two-round system in France shows strategic voting in the first round, due to considerations which candidate will reach the second round.

Germany 
The mixed-member proportional representation allows to estimate the share of strategic voters in first-past-the-post voting due to the separate votes for party-lists and local single-winner electoral district candidates. The vote for party-lists is considered sincere if the party vote share is significantly above the 5% electoral threshold in Germany. In Germany the share of strategic voters was found around 30%, which decreased to 9% if only non-allied party candidates were contenders for the electoral district winner. In a contentious election year the share of strategic voters increased to around 45%. 

Due to electoral threshold in party-list proportional representation one party asked in several elections their voters to vote for another allied party to help this party cross the electoral threshold.

Hong Kong 
In Hong Kong, with its party-list proportional representation using largest remainder method with the Hare quota, voters supporting candidates of the pro-democracy camp often organize to divide their votes across different tickets, avoiding the concentration of votes on one or a few candidates. In 2016 Hong Kong Legislative Election, the practices of strategic voting were expanded by Benny Tai's Project ThunderGo. The anti-establishment camp gained 29 seats, which was a historical record.

Hungary 
In Hungary, during the 2018 Hungarian parliamentary election, several websites, such as taktikaiszavazas.hu (meaning "strategic voting"), promoted the idea to vote for opposition candidates with the highest probability of winning a given seat. About a quarter of opposition voters adopted this behavior, resulting in a total of 498,000 extra votes gained by opposition parties. A total of 14 extra single seats were taken by several parties and independent candidates.

Lithuania 
In Lithuania, which has a parallel voting system at parliamentary and district levels, most of strategic voting takes place in single-member constituencies (or districts in mayoral elections). These constituencies have two-round system when no candidate wins more than 50 per cent of the votes in the first round. A notable example of strategic voting at the parliamentary level could be the 10th Naujoji Vilnia constituency in 2016 Lithuanian parliamentary election. To prevent independent candidate Algirdas Paleckis' victory, the Liberal Movement's, the Lithuanian Farmers and Greens Union's and the Social Democratic Party's candidates endorsed their supporters to vote for the Homeland Union's candidate Monika Navickienė (who came in second place). Monika Navickienė eventually won the constituency by around 900 votes. At a district level, an example could be Kėdainiai district's mayoral election in the 2015 municipal elections. In the first round, the Labour Party won 13 seats of 26 seats in district council and was just one seat short of absolute majority. Nijolė Naujokienė (candidate to the district's mayoral seat from the Labour Party) came short by 0.68 per cent in the mayoral election. Her opponent, Saulius Grinkevičius, had a 22 per cent gap to overcome. In the second round, Saulius Grinkevičius won by around 8 per cent (and 1,600 votes).

New Zealand 
Since New Zealand moved to mixed-member proportional representation voting in 1996, the electoral system of New Zealand has seen strategic voting regularly occur in several elections, including one party explicitly or implicitly encouraging voters to vote for a candidate other than theirs. This happened first in 1996 in the Wellington Central, and then in 1999 in the Coromandel. From 2002 until 2017 it was a regular feature in the Ohariu-Belmont, and from 2005 in the Epsom.

Slovenia 
In the 2011 Slovenian parliamentary election, 30% of voters voted tactically. Public polls predicted an easy win for Janez Janša, the candidate of the Slovenian Democratic Party; however, his opponent Zoran Janković, the candidate of Positive Slovenia, won. Prominent Slovenian public opinion researchers found that such proportions of strategic voting had not been recorded anywhere else before.

Spain 
In the 2016 General Election in Spain, the incentives for voting tactically were much larger than usual, following the rise of the Podemos and Ciudadanos and following the economic crisis and election in 2015. The strategic voters successfully influenced the outcome of the election, despite a record low turnout of 66.5%.

Taiwan 
In the 1995 Legislative Yuan elections, strategic voting was implemented by the opposition parties, such as the Democratic Progressive Party and the New Party. As the members were elected in multi-member districts, the parties urged their supporters to vote for a party-nominated candidate according to criteria, such as the last digit of the voter's National Identification Card Number or the voter's birth month. This maximized the opposition's seat gains and resulted in the ruling Kuomintang losing 10 seats, receiving the lowest share of seats in history at the time.

United Kingdom 

In the 1997 UK general election, Democratic Left helped Bruce Kent set up GROT (Get Rid Of Them) a strategic voter campaign whose aim was to help prevent the Conservative Party from gaining a 5th term in office. This coalition was drawn from individuals in all the main opposition parties, and many who were not aligned with any party. While it is hard to prove that GROT swung the election itself, it did attract significant media attention and brought strategic voting into the mainstream for the first time in UK politics. In 2001, the Democratic Left's successor organisation, the New Politics Network, organised a similar campaign. Since then strategic voting has become a consideration in British politics as is reflected in by-elections and by the growth in sites such as tacticalvote.co.uk, who encourage strategic voting as a way of defusing the two party system and empowering the individual voter. For the 2015 UK general election, voteswap.org helped prevent the Conservative Party staying in government by encouraging Green Party supporters to tactically vote for the Labour Party in listed marginal seats. In 2017 swapmyvote.uk was formed to help supporters of all parties swap their votes with people in other constituencies.

In the 2006 local elections in London, strategic voting was promoted by sites such as London Strategic Voter in a response to national and international issues.

In Northern Ireland, it is believed that (predominantly Protestant) Unionist voters in Nationalist strongholds have voted for the Social Democratic and Labour Party (SDLP) to prevent Sinn Féin from capturing such seats. This conclusion was reached by comparing results to the demographics of constituencies and polling districts.

In the 2017 general election, it is estimated that 6.5 million people (more than 20% of voters) voted tactically either as a way of preventing a "hard Brexit" or preventing another Conservative government led by the Tactical2017 campaign. Many Green Party candidates withdrew from the race in order to help the Labour Party secure closely fought seats against the Conservatives. This ultimately led to the Conservatives losing seats in the election even though they increased their overall vote share.

In the 2019 Conservative Party leadership election to determine the final two candidates for the party vote, it was suggested that front-runner Boris Johnson's campaign encouraged some of its MPs to back Jeremy Hunt instead of Johnson, so that Hunt—seen as "a lower-energy challenger"—would finish in second place, allowing an easier defeat in the party vote. Strategic voting was expected to play a major role in the 2019 General Election, with a YouGov poll suggesting that 19% of voters would be doing so tactically. 49% of strategic voters said they would do so in the hope of stopping a party whose views they opposed.

According to a 2020 study, older voters in the UK vote strategically more than younger voters, and richer voters vote more strategically than poorer voters.

United States 
Strategic voting in the US's first-past-the-post voting and presidential system contributes to a two-party system, where the observed effect of Duverger's law is stronger than in most countries. One high-profile example of strategic voting was the 2002 California gubernatorial election. During the Republican primaries, Republicans Richard Riordan (former mayor of Los Angeles) and Bill Simon (a self-financed businessman) vied for a chance to compete against the unpopular incumbent Democratic Governor of California, Gray Davis. Polls predicted that Riordan would defeat Davis, while Simon would not. At that time, the Republican primaries were open primaries in which anyone could vote regardless of their party affiliation. Davis supporters were rumored to have voted for Simon because Riordan was perceived as a greater threat to Davis; this, combined with a negative advertising campaign by Davis describing Riordan as a "big-city liberal", allowed Simon to win the primary despite a last-minute business scandal. The strategy to nominate Simon (if in fact it was a reality), was successful, as he lost in the general election against Davis.

Puerto Rico 
Puerto Rico's 2004 elections were affected by strategic voting. Pedro Rosselló, the New Progressive Party's candidate of that year, was unpopular across much of the territory due to large corruption schemes and the privatization of public corporations. To prevent Rossell from winning, other factions supported the Partido Popular Democratico's candidate. The elections were close; statehood advocates won a seat in the U.S. house of representatives and majorities in both legislative branches, but lost governance to Aníbal Acevedo Vilá. (Puerto Ricans have the chance to vote by party or by candidate. Separatists voted under their ideology but for the center party's candidate, which caused major turmoil.) After a recount and a trial, Acevedo Vilá was certified as governor of the Commonwealth of Puerto Rico.

Rational voter model 
Academic analysis of strategic voting is based on the rational voter model, derived from rational choice theory. In this model, voters are short-term instrumentally rational. That is, voters are only voting in order to make an impact on one election at a time (not, say, to build the political party for next election); voters have a set of sincere preferences, or utility rankings, by which to rate candidates; voters have some knowledge of each other's preferences; and voters understand how best to use strategic voting to their advantage. The extent to which this model resembles real-life elections is the subject of considerable academic debate.

Myerson–Weber strategy 
An example of a rational voter strategy is described by Myerson and Weber. The strategy is broadly applicable to a number of single-winner voting methods that are additive point methods, such as Plurality, Borda, Approval, and Range. The strategy is optimal in the sense that the strategy will maximize the voter's expected utility when the number of voters is sufficiently large.

This rational voter model assumes that the voter's utility of the election result is dependent only on which candidate wins and not on any other aspect of the election, for example showing support for a losing candidate in the vote tallies. The model also assumes the voter chooses how to vote individually and not in collaboration with other voters.

Given a set of k candidates and a voter let:

 vi = the number of points to be voted for candidate i
 ui = the voter's gain in utility if candidate i wins the election
 pij = the (voter's perceived) pivot probability that candidates i and j will be tied for the most total points to win the election.

Then the voter's prospective rating for a candidate i is defined as:

 

The gain in expected utility for a given vote is given by:

 

The gain in expected utility can be maximized by choosing a vote with suitable values of vi, depending on the voting method and the voter's prospective ratings for each candidate. For specific voting methods, the gain can be maximized using the following rules:

 Plurality: Vote for the candidate with the highest prospective rating. This is to be distinguished from choosing the best of the frontrunners, which is a common but imprecise plurality tactic. The highest prospective rating can in fact belong to a weak candidate, even the weakest.
 Borda: Rank the candidates in decreasing order of prospective rating.
 Approval: Vote for all candidates that have a positive prospective rating; do not vote for any candidates that have a negative prospective rating.
 Range: Vote the maximum points for all candidates that have a positive prospective rating; vote the minimum allowed value for all candidates that have a negative prospective rating; vote any number of points for a candidate with a prospective rating of zero.

Pivot probabilities are rarely estimated in political forecasting, but can be estimated from predicted winning probabilities. 
An important special case occurs when the voter has no information about how other voters will vote. This is sometimes referred to as the zero information strategy. In this special case, the pij pivot probabilities are all equal and the rules for the specific voting methods become:

 Plurality: Vote for the most preferred (highest utility) candidate. This is the sincere plurality vote.
 Borda: Rank the candidates in decreasing order preference (decreasing order of utility). This is the sincere ranking of the candidates.
 Approval: Calculate the average utility of all candidates. Vote for all candidates that have a higher-than-average utility; do not vote for any candidates that have a lower-than-average utility.
 Range: Calculate the average utility of all candidates. Vote the maximum points for all candidates that have a higher-than-average utility; vote the minimum points for all candidates that have a lower-than-average utility; vote any value for a candidate with a utility equal to the average.

Myerson and Weber also describe voting equilibria that require all voters use the optimal strategy and all voters share a common set of pij pivot probabilities. Because of these additional requirements, such equilibria may in practice be less widely applicable than the strategies.

Pre-election influence 

Because strategic voting relies heavily on voters' perception of how other voters intend to vote, campaigns in electoral methods that promote compromise frequently focus on affecting voters' perception of campaign viability. Most campaigns craft refined media strategies to shape the way voters see their candidacy. During this phase, there can be an analogous effect where campaign donors and activists may decide whether or not to support candidates tactically with their money and time.

In rolling elections, or runoff votes, where some voters have information about previous voters' preferences (e.g. presidential primaries in the French presidential elections), candidates put disproportionate resources into competing strongly in the first few stages, because those stages affect the reaction of later stages.

Influence of voting method 
Strategic voting is highly dependent on the voting method being used. A strategic vote which improves a voter's satisfaction under one method could make no change or lead to a less-satisfying result under another method. Arrow's impossibility theorem and the Gibbard–Satterthwaite theorem prove that any useful single-winner voting method based on preference ranking is prone to some kind of manipulation. Game theory has been used to search for some kind of "minimally manipulatable" (incentive compatibility) voting schemes. Game theory can also be used to analyze the pros and cons of different methods. For instance, when electors vote for their own preferences rather than tactically, Condorcet method-like methods tend to settle on compromise candidates, while instant-runoff voting favors those candidates with strong core support but otherwise narrower appeal due to holding more uncompromising positions.

Moreover, although by the Gibbard–Satterthwaite theorem no deterministic single-winner voting method is immune to strategic voting in all cases, some methods' results are more resistant to strategic voting than others'. M. Badinski and R. Laraki, the inventors of the majority judgment method, performed an initial investigation of this question using a set of Monte Carlo simulated elections based on the results from a poll of the 2007 French presidential election which they had carried out using rated ballots. Comparing range voting, Borda count, plurality voting, approval voting with two different absolute approval thresholds, Condorcet voting, and majority judgment, they found that range voting had the highest (worst) strategic vulnerability, while their own method majority judgment had the lowest (best). Further investigation would be needed to be sure that this result remained true with different sets of candidates.

In particular methods

Plurality voting 

Strategic voting by compromising is exceedingly common in plurality elections. The most typical tactic is to assess which two candidates are frontrunners (most likely to win) and to vote for the preferred one of those two, even if a third candidate is preferred over both. Duverger's law argues that this kind of strategic voting, along with the spoiler effect which can arise when such tactics are not used, will be so common that any method based on plurality will eventually result in two-party domination. Although this "law" is just an empirical observation rather than a mathematical certainty, it is generally supported by the evidence.

Due to the especially deep impact of strategic voting in such a method, some argue that systems with three or more strong or persistent parties become in effect forms of disapproval voting, where the expression of disapproval in order to keep an opponent out of office overwhelms the expression of approval to elect a desirable candidate.

Party-list proportional representation 
The presence of an electoral threshold (typically at around 5% or 4%) can lead to voters voting tactically for a different party to their preferred political party (which may be more hardline or more moderate) in order to ensure that the party passes the threshold. An alliance of parties can fail to win a majority despite outpolling their rivals if one party in the alliance falls beneath the threshold. An example of this is the 2009 Norwegian election in which the right-wing opposition parties won more votes between them than the parties in the governing coalition, but the narrow failure of the Liberal Party to cross the 4% threshold led to the governing coalition winning a majority.

This effect has sometimes been nicknamed "Comrade 4%" in Sweden, where the electoral threshold is 4%, particularly when referring to supporters of the Social Democrats who vote tactically for the more hardline Left Party. In the 2013 German federal election, the Free Democratic Party got only 4.8% of the votes so did not meet the 5% threshold. The party did not win any directly elected seats, so for the first time since 1949 was not represented in the Bundestag. Hence their ally the Christian Democratic Union had to form a grand coalition with the Social Democratic Party.

In several recent elections in New Zealand the National Party has suggested that National supporters in certain electorates should vote for minor parties or candidates who can win an electorate seat and would support a National government. This culminated in the Tea tape scandal when a meeting in the Epsom electorate in 2011 was taped. The meeting was to encourage National voters in the electorate to vote "strategically" for the ACT candidate; and it was suggested that Labour Party voters in the electorate should vote "strategically" for the National candidate as the Labour candidate could not win the seat but a National win in the seat would deprive National of an ally. The two major parties National and Labour always top up their electorate MPs with list MPs, so a National win in the seat would not increase the number of National MPs.

Even in countries with a low threshold such as the Netherlands, strategic voting can still happen for other reasons. In the campaign for the 2012 Dutch election, the Socialist Party had enjoyed good poll ratings, but many voters who preferred the Socialists voted instead for the more centrist Labour Party out of fear that a strong showing from the Socialists would lead to political deadlock. It was also suggested that a symmetrical effect on the right caused the Party for Freedom to lose support to the more centrist VVD.

In elections which there are many party lists competing with only a few seats, such as Hong Kong Legislative Council election, the outcome will tend to be similar to that of single non-transferable vote (SNTV): only the first candidate in a list will win. In such elections parties will split the candidates into multiple lists, since competing using "remainder" votes in both lists is easier than having "full quota" votes plus "remainder" votes if the party puts their candidates in a single list, and a list reaching "full quota" vote is considered a waste. In such elections the behavior of voters is similar that of SNTV elections: voters will avoid a candidate reaching the "full quota", and spread their votes to other candidates that have potential to win.

Cardinal single-winner voting 
All cardinal voting methods fail the later-no-harm criterion due to favoring consensus options.

Majority judgment 

In majority judgment, strategy is typically "semi-honest exaggeration." Voters exaggerate the difference between a certain pair of candidates but do not rank any less-preferred candidate over any more-preferred one. Even this form of exaggeration can only have an effect if the voter's honest rating for the intended winner is below that candidate's median rating or their honest rating for the intended loser is above it.

Typically, this would not be the case unless there were two similar candidates favored by the same set of voters. A strategic vote against a similar rival could result in a favored candidate winning; although if voters for both similar rivals used this strategy, it could cause a candidate favored by neither of these voter groups to win.

Balinski and Laraki argue that since under Majority judgment, many voters have no opportunity to use strategy, in a test using simulated elections based on polling data, this method is the most strategy-resistant of the ones that the authors studied.

Approval voting 

Similarly, in approval voting, unlike many other methods, strategy almost never involves ranking a less-preferred candidate over a more-preferred candidate. However, strategy is in fact inevitable when a voter decides their "approval cutoff"; this is a variation of the compromising strategy. Overall, Steven Brams and Dudley R. Herschbach argued in a paper in Science magazine in 2001 that approval voting was the method least amenable to tactical perturbations. Meanwhile, Balinski and Laraki used rated ballots from a poll of the 2007 French presidential election to show that, if unstrategic voters only approved candidates whom they considered "very good" or better, strategic voters would be able to sway the result frequently, but that if unstrategic voters approved all candidates they considered "good" or better, approval was the second most strategy-resistant method of the ones they studied.

Approval voting forces voters to face an initial voting tactical decision as to whether to vote for (or approve) of their second-choice candidate or not. The voter may want to retain expression of preference of their favorite candidate over their second choice. But that does not allow the same voter to express preference of their second choice over any other. One simple situation in which Approval strategy is important is if there is a close election between two similar candidates A and B and one distinct one Z, in which Z has 49% support. If all of Z's supporters approve just him, in hopes of him getting just enough to win, then supporters of A are faced with a tactical choice of whether to approve A and B (getting one of their preferred choices but having no say in which) or approving just A (possibly helping choose her over B, but risking throwing the election to Z). B's supporters face the same dilemma.

Score voting 

In score voting, strategic voters who expect all other voters to be strategic will exaggerate their true preferences and use the same quasi-compromising strategy as in approval voting, above. That is, they will give all candidates either the highest possible or the lowest possible rating. This presents an additional problem as compared to the approval method if some voters give honest "weak" votes with middle rankings and other voters give strategic approval votes. A strategic minority could overpower an honest majority. This problem can be minimized through education or ballot design to encourage uninformed voters to give more-extreme rankings. A different path to minimize this problem is to use median scores instead of total scores, as median scores are less amenable to exaggeration, as in majority judgment.

However, if all voter factions have the same proportion of strategic and honest voters, simulations show that any significant proportion of honest voters will lead to results which tend to be more satisfying to voters than approval voting, and indeed, more satisfying than any other method with the same unbiased proportion of strategic voters.

Strategic voters are faced with the initial tactic as to how highly to score their second-choice candidate. The voter may want to retain expression of a high preference of their favorite candidate over their second choice. But that does not allow the same voter to express a high preference of their second choice over any others.

In a simulation study using polling data collected under a majority judgment method, that method's designers found that score voting was more vulnerable to strategy than any other method they studied, including plurality.

Cardinal multi-winner voting 
Evaluative Proportional Representation (EPR) and sequential proportional approval voting reduces strategic voting compared to single-winner voting. Strategic voting is observed for cardinal multi-winner voting.

Ranked single-winner voting

Instant runoff voting 

Instant runoff voting is vulnerable to push-over and compromising strategies (although it is less vulnerable to compromising than the plurality method). Bullet voting is ineffective under Instant-runoff, since Instant-runoff satisfies the later-no-harm criterion.

Borda 

The Borda count has both a strong compromising incentive and a large vulnerability to burying. Here is a hypothetical example of both factors at the same time: if there are two candidates the most likely to win, the voter can maximize the impact on the contest between these candidates by ranking the candidate the voter likes more in first place, ranking the candidate whom they like less in last place. If neither candidate is the sincere first or last choice, the voter is using both the compromising and burying strategies at once. If many different groups voters use this strategy, this gives a paradoxical advantage to the candidate generally thought least likely to win.

Condorcet 

While IRV and STV generally do not satisfy the Condorcet criterion, Condorcet method variants like Ranked pairs and CPO-STV do. 

Condorcet methods have a further-reduced incentive for the compromising strategy, but they have some vulnerability to the burying strategy. The extent of this vulnerability depends on the particular Condorcet method. Some Condorcet methods arguably reduce the vulnerability to burying to the point where it is no longer a significant problem. All guaranteed Condorcet methods are vulnerable to the bullet voting strategy, because they violate the later-no-harm criterion.

Ranked multi-winner voting

Single transferable vote 

Multi-winner ranked voting methods are more resistant to strategic voting compared to single-winner ranked voting methods. More sophisticated tactics may be practicable where the number of candidates, voters and/or seats to be filled is relatively small.
The single transferable vote has an incentive for free riding, a form of compromising strategy sometimes used in proportional representation methods. If one feels the favoured candidate is certain to be elected in any case, insincerely ranking the second candidate first does not hurt the favoured candidate.

Some forms of STV allow strategic voters to gain an advantage by listing a candidate who is very likely to lose in first place, as a form of pushover. Meek's method essentially eliminates this strategy.

In Malta's STV the two-party system can cause strategic voting away from third parties.

See also 

 Electoral fusion
 Keynesian beauty contest
 Lesser of two evils
 Primary election
 Ranked voting
 Ranked-choice voting in the United States
 Skirt and Blouse voting
 Strategic nomination
 Tactical manipulation of runoff voting
 Vote allocation
 Vote swapping

References

Sources 
 
 Svensson, Lars-Gunnar (1999). The Proof of the Gibbard–Satterthwaite Theorem Revisited
 Brams, Herschbach (2001). "The Science of Elections", Science Online. Abstract
 Fisher, Stephen (2001). [ Extending the Rational Voter Theory of Tactical Voting]

External links 
 Tactical Voting Can Be a Weak Strategy—Article on strategic voting within larger strategic considerations [archived]
 VoteRoll.com VoteRoll is a blog roll voting system that offers tiered strategic voting to develop statistics for people voting online since 2010.

Voting theory
Psephology
Party-list proportional representation